Filippo Riceputi (July 11, 1667 – October 5, 1742) was an Italian historian.

He was born in Forlì. In 1693 he was ordained as priest, and in 1694 he was appointed as the rector of the Episcopal Seminary of Macerata, where he taught rhetoric. In 1695 he relocated to Vienna, where he joined the Society of Jesus. There he began to collect material for what was to become Illyricum sacrum - a work on the history of countries that were a part of the former Roman province of Illyricum. He continued to collect historical material during the service in Jesuit colleges in Gorizia, Rijeka and Trieste, and during the missionary stay in Dalmatia (1709–1715).

In 1716 he went to Venice, whence he was reassigned to the Jesuit college in Padua with the task of completing the ecclesiastical history of Illyricum. In his work on collecting, studying and arranging the material he received help from the Archbishop of Split, Pacifico Bizza. In 1720 the first draft of the work was published. In 1729 it was decided that the work will also cover the secular history of Illyricum, and in 1740 the second draft was published. Until his death Riceputi has compiled a comprehensive introduction to Illyricum sacrum, and the work was completed by his colleagues Daniele Farlati and Giovanni Giacomo Coleti.

He died in Cesena.

References

18th-century Italian historians
1667 births
1742 deaths
18th-century Italian Jesuits